Tharika Sewwandi (born 18 July 2000) is a Sri Lankan cricketer. In January 2019, she was named in Sri Lanka's squad for their series against South Africa. She made her Women's One Day International cricket (WODI) debut for Sri Lanka against South Africa Women on 17 February 2019.

In November 2019, she was named in Sri Lanka's squad for the women's cricket tournament at the 2019 South Asian Games. The Sri Lankan team won the silver medal, after losing to Bangladesh by two runs in the final.

In October 2021, she was named in Sri Lanka's team for the 2021 Women's Cricket World Cup Qualifier tournament in Zimbabwe. In January 2022, she was named in Sri Lanka's team for the 2022 Commonwealth Games Cricket Qualifier tournament in Malaysia. She made her Women's Twenty20 International cricket (WT20I) debut for Sri Lanka against Kenya Women on 20 January 2022.

References

External links
 

2000 births
Living people
Sri Lankan women cricketers
Sri Lanka women One Day International cricketers
Sri Lanka women Twenty20 International cricketers
Place of birth missing (living people)
South Asian Games silver medalists for Sri Lanka
South Asian Games medalists in cricket